The Großer Hermannsberg is a mountain, 867 metres high, south of the main ridge of the Thuringian Forest in the county of Schmalkalden-Meiningen in Germany.

Location and area  
To the north and immediately below the mountain is the village of Oberschönau and the adjacent Kanzlersgrund. Behind them is the main ridge of the Thuringian Forest with its long-distance trail, the Rennsteig. In front of the ridge are the mountains of Hohe Möst and Hoher Stein. To the southwest lies Bermbach, to the southeast is Zella-Mehlis and to the east is Oberhof.

Routes to the summit 
 From Oberschönau or the Kanzlersgrund via the Oberschönau Hiking Hut (Ski- und Wanderhütte Oberschönau), past the plateau of the Kleiner Hermannsberg. From the Fuhrmannswiese pasture south of the mountain a path runs steeply uphill to the northern viewing rocks with their refuge hut. From this hut a path runs south to the main summit and its viewing rocks. As a return route a path can be taken from the Fuhrmannswiese on the north side of the mountain which returns to the hiker's hut.
 From the hiker's car park at the Knüllfeld the route heads for Ruppberg, before crossing the Fuhrmannswiese diagonally and continuing as above.

Summit description 

From the northern lookout rocks, the path runs along below the summit which, according to an inscription, is actually 873 metres high. From the path there is a further view of the Rhön mountains. Continuing towards the viewing rocks there is a view looking east by a small rock (see photograph below). The actual viewing rocks may be climbed using steps hewn out of the rock and a safety cable; the top is protected by railings. The top of these rocks is recorded on all the maps as being 867 metres high.

View 

 North
 Oberschönau (from the northern viewing rocks)
 East
 Donnershauk, Hohe Möst
 Kanzlersgrund
 Schanzenanlage Kanzlersgrund, Hoher Stein
 Gebrannter Stein
 Schneekopf
 Southeast
 Ringberghaus and Adlersberg Tower near Suhl
 From south to northwest
 Gleichberge
 Dolmar
 Kreuzberg (Rhön)
 Hutsberg and Neuberg
 Hohe Geba
 Heidelstein and Wasserkuppe
 Diesburg and Leichelberg
 Milseburg
 Steinbach-Hallenberg
 Baier, Dietrichsberg, Öchsenberg, Kaliberge
 Altersbach and Rotterode

External links 

 Annotated view from the Großer Hermannsberg looking south and west at www.panorama-photo.net

Mountains under 1000 metres
Mountains and hills of Thuringia
Thuringian Forest
Schmalkalden-Meiningen